Howest, de Hogeschool West-Vlaanderen (English: Howest University of Applied Sciences), abbreviated as HOWEST, is a university of applied sciences in West Flanders, a province of Belgium with five campuses situated in Bruges and Kortrijk. 

Howest is an entrepreneurial University of Applied Sciences known for its innovative and interdisciplinary approach to education and research, and its close collaboration with industry, business and the social profit sector. Howest is a member of Ghent University Association and is fully accredited by NVAO, the Dutch-Flemish Accreditation Organisation. 
It offers 24 Bachelors, 10 Associate Degrees and many Postgraduate Certificate programmes, all with a strong practical focus, in the areas of Business & Management, Industrial Sciences & Technology, Digital Design, Architecture, Healthcare, Education and Social Sciences. 

Howest is renowned for its Tech-programmes, such as Cybersecurity, Digital Design and Development and Digital Arts and Entertainment. According to The Princeton Review® Howest University of Applied Sciences is one of the top undergraduate schools at which you can study game design. With its Bachelor programme in Digital Arts and Entertainment (DAE), Howest ranked# 21 on the undergraduate programmes list for 2020. Howest and DAE programme also got the first place in The Rookies Award as Best Game Design and Development School in the world in 2017, 2018 and 2021, and fifth place in 2019. 

Field-driven assignments, on-the-job training and internships are key components of each programme. Over the years, Howest has built a solid reputation in application-oriented scientific research, services and education, partnering with universities and work-field organisations in Belgium, Europe, and all over the world. Students and staff are given opportunities to go global and gain international experience, thanks to international networks, scholarships and exchange programmes.

References

Official website
 Official website

Universities in Belgium